William Frederick Jaffray (25 March 1885 – 7 May 1968) was a Scottish professional footballer who played in the Scottish League for Aberdeen as an outside left.

Personal life 
Jaffray emigrated to the US with his family in 1915. He was married and had five children.

Career statistics

References 

Scottish footballers
Brentford F.C. players
Southern Football League players
Scottish Football League players
Aberdeen F.C. players
Association football outside forwards
Peterhead F.C. players
Leith Athletic F.C. players
Raith Rovers F.C. players
Brechin City F.C. players
Footballers from Aberdeen
1885 births
1968 deaths
Scottish expatriate sportspeople in the United States
20th-century Scottish businesspeople